In the early 20th century, the Greek Navy embarked on an expansion program to counter a strengthening of Greece's traditional rival, the Ottoman Empire. The Ottomans ordered a new dreadnought battleship, ; in response, Greece ordered the dreadnought  from a German shipyard. The Ottomans acquired the ex-Brazilian  and renamed her . Greece responded with a second battleship ordered in France, Vasilefs Konstantinos, built to the same design as the French . As the Ottomans had a significant head start in battleship construction, the Greek Navy purchased two obsolete American pre-dreadnoughts— and —as a stop-gap measure in June 1914.

Greek naval plans were interrupted by the outbreak of World War I in August 1914, however. Work halted on Vasilefs Konstantinos in August and on Salamis in December 1914. As a result, Kilkis and Lemnos were the only battleships delivered to Greece. Greece remained neutral for the first three years of World War I, though in October 1916, France seized the Greek Navy and disarmed both of the battleships. They remained inactive for the rest of the war. Both ships saw service in 1919–1922 during the Greco–Turkish War. They continued to serve with the fleet until the early 1930s, when they were reduced to secondary roles. Lemnos became a barracks ship while Kilkis became a training ship. During the German invasion of Greece in April 1941, both ships were attacked and sunk in Salamis by Ju 87 Stuka dive-bombers. The two old battleships were scrapped after the end of the war.

Key

Salamis

Starting in 1911, the Ottoman Empire—Greece's traditional naval rival—set about modernizing its fleet. That year, the Ottomans ordered the dreadnought . The expansion of Ottoman naval power threatened Greek control of the Aegean; to counter the Ottoman dreadnought, Greece decided to order a dreadnought of its own, Salamis, from a German shipyard. The keel was laid down on 23 July 1913; the hull was complete and ready for launching by 11 November 1914. However, the outbreak of World War I in August 1914 interrupted her completion; work stopped on 31 December 1914. The guns that had been ordered for the ship in the United States were instead sold by the manufacturer, Bethlehem Steel, to the Royal Navy to arm the British s. After the end of the war, the Greek Navy refused to accept the incomplete hull. She was eventually scrapped in 1932 following a lengthy arbitration between the Greek Navy and the German shipyard.

Vasilefs Konstantinos

Following the Ottoman purchase of a second dreadnought in December 1913, a previously Brazilian ship still under construction, the Greek Navy responded with an order for a second dreadnought of its own. The new battleship was to be named Vasilefs Konstantinos and was to be built to the same design as the French  from AC de St Nazaire Penhoet. Work began in June 1914 but ceased on the outbreak of war in August and never resumed. The Greek Navy refused the incomplete ship after the end of the war, leading to a contract dispute, which was settled in 1925. The unfinished ship was subsequently broken up for scrap.

Kilkis and Lemnos

They served with the US fleet until June 1914, when they were purchased by the Greek Navy as a stop-gap measure. They were needed to counter Ottoman naval expansion while the Greeks waited on their newly ordered dreadnoughts to be completed abroad. The two ships reached Greece in July 1914, just before the outbreak of World War I at the end of the month. As Greece remained neutral during the first three years of the war, the two ships saw little service. In October 1916, the French seized the Greek fleet and disarmed Kilkis and Lemnos; they were put back into service at the end of the war. Both ships saw service during the Greco–Turkish War in 1919–1922, with Lemnos also participating in the Allied intervention in the Russian Civil War.

Both ships continued to see service in the Greek fleet until the early 1930s, with Kilkis serving as the flagship of the fleet. In 1932, Lemnos was disarmed and used as a barracks ship, and Kilkis was reduced to a training ship. Lemnos was used as a barracks ship after 1937, and Kilkis became a floating battery at Salamis Naval Base in 1940. During the German invasion of Greece in April 1941, both ships were attacked and sunk in Salamis. German Ju 87 Stuka dive-bombers bombed both ships in the harbor; Kilkis was sunk outright while Lemnos was beached to avoid sinking. Both ships were broken up after the end of the war.

See also
 List of battleships

Footnotes
Notes

Citations

References
 
 
 
 
 
 
 

Greece